C. Henry Kempe (birth name Karl Heinz Kempe; April 6, 1922 in Breslau, Germany (now Wrocław, Poland) – March 3, 1984 in Hanauma Bay, Hawaii) was an American pediatrician and the first in the medical community to identify and recognize child abuse.

In 1962, Kempe and his colleagues, including Brandt F. Steele and Henry Silver, published the paper "The Battered-Child Syndrome", which led to the identification and recognition by the medical community of child abuse.  This syndrome has since been discredited by medical science and shows the problems when medical doctors are tasked with law enforcement resulting in overturned convictions and innocent people being incarcerated. 

Kempe received two nominations for the Nobel Prize: the first nomination was for his work in developing a safer smallpox vaccine; the second was recognition for his contribution to the prevention and treatment of child abuse. Due to the efforts of Kempe, abuse reporting laws exist in all 50 US states. His efforts also led to the passage of the 1972 Colorado law requiring legal counsel for the child in all cases of suspected abuse.

Early life
Born into a Jewish family in Germany during the rise of the Nazi party, Kempe fled Germany as a teenager and came to the United States of America.  He learned a new language, completed high school and college, and eventually became a physician.  Specializing in the study of virology, he helped develop Vaccinia immune globulin to counter the adverse effects of the smallpox vaccine.

Kempe became the youngest chairman of the pediatrics department at the University of Colorado. During his tenure, he began to recognize the prevalence of non-accidental injuries to children.  He demanded a better diagnostic investigation of the unexplained and life-threatening injuries observed in children at four different hospital emergency rooms: shattered bones, inflicted burns, and brain damage.

His research led to the publication of "The Battered-Child Syndrome".

Career

Kempe Center
Kempe, his colleagues and wife Ruth Kempe founded The Kempe Center, originally the National Center for the Prevention and Treatment of Child Abuse and Neglect, in 1972 to prevent and treat child abuse and neglect.

In 1976, The Kempe Foundation was established to spearhead fundraising, awareness and advocacy efforts for children.

The Kempe Center and The Kempe Foundation are currently located at The Gary Pavilion at Children's Hospital (Aurora, Colorado).

The C. Henry Kempe Award
First awarded in 1985, The Kempe Award is presented to professionals and philanthropists who have contributed substantially to the community on behalf of children and who have creatively fought the war against child abuse.  The award is given every two years by ISPCAN, The International Society for the Prevention of Child Abuse and Neglect, to an outstanding young professional or organization working in any discipline in the field of child abuse and neglect.

Awards
 1959 - E. Mead Johnson Award

Personal
Kempe met his future wife Ruth Svibergson while they were both in residency at Yale and they married in 1948. Ruth, who was also later a professor at CU, and Henry had five daughters. Ruth and Henry were co-authors of several books, including Healthy Babies; Happy Parents.

See also
 Child abuse
 Neglect

Footnotes

External links
 Kempe Center
 Tardieu's syndrome

1922 births
1984 deaths
20th-century American physicians
American pediatricians
American virologists
Child abuse
German emigrants to the United States
University of Colorado faculty
Members of the National Academy of Medicine